Arakawa Dam is a rockfill dam located in Yamanashi Prefecture in Japan. The dam is used for flood control and water supply. The catchment area of the dam is 126.4 km2. The dam impounds about 41  ha of land when full and can store 10800 thousand cubic meters of water. The construction of the dam was started on 1973 and completed in 1985.

References

Dams in Yamanashi Prefecture
1985 establishments in Japan